The 1910 Fruitgum Company is an American bubblegum pop band of the 1960s.  The group's Billboard Hot 100 hits were "Simon Says", "May I Take a Giant Step", "1, 2, 3, Red Light", "Goody Goody Gumdrops", "Indian Giver", "Special Delivery", and "The Train".

Career
The band began as Jeckell and The Hydes in New Jersey in 1966.  The original  members were Frank Jeckell, Mark Gutkowski, Floyd Marcus, Pat Karwan and Steve Mortkowitz - all from Linden, New Jersey.

During 1967, they were signed to Buddah Records, where they released five LPs under their own name and a variety of singles, as well as appearing on the LP The Kasenetz-Katz Singing Orchestral Circus, which sounded like the usual Buddah studio band in spite of its promotion as a "bubblegum superjam". Their first hit single, "Simon Says", was written by Elliot Chiprut. During the recording process, the band changed the beat and patterned the song after "Wooly Bully" by Sam the Sham and the Pharaohs.  "Simon Says" soon became a success, hitting #4 on the US Billboard Hot 100 chart.  The track peaked at #2 on the UK Singles Chart and was heard in the 1968 Frederick Wiseman documentary High School.
  The band started touring, opening for major acts such as  The Beach Boys.  They also released these other chart hits: "May I Take a Giant Step" (U.S. #63), "1, 2, 3, Red Light" (U.S. #5), "Special Delivery" (U.S. #38), "Goody, Goody Gumdrops" (U.S. #37), "Indian Giver" (U.S. #5) and "The Train" (U.S. #57).

The original group disbanded in 1970.

In the years of 1979-1980 the band was briefly resurrected through Jolly Joyce Agency out of Philadelphia with members Chuck Allen, Fred Eyer, Tony DiNiso, Cindy Tritz, Mike Schneider and Kevin.

In 1999, original member Frank Jeckell and Mick Mansueto put the act back together. As of 2019, Fruitgum currently performs its own hits, in addition to other songs from the 1960s.

Million sellers
"Simon Says" sold three and a half million. "1, 2, 3, Red Light" and "Indian Giver" each sold over one million copies.  All three were awarded gold discs.

Members, past and present

Current lineup
Frank Jeckell (Original Member Guitar and Vocals)
Mick Mansueto (Lead Vocals and Percussion)
Glenn Lewis (Bass and Vocals)
Eric Lipper (Keyboards and Vocals)
Keith Crane (Drums)
John Roginski (Guitar, Keyboards and Vocals)

Former members
Mark Gutkowski (Original Member Lead Singer on all the hits and Hammond B3 Organist)
Pat Karwan (Original Member Lead Guitarist and Vocals)
Steve Mortkowitz (Original Member Bass Player and Vocals)
Floyd Marcus (Original Member Drummer and Vocals)
Mick Mansueto (Lead vocals)
Jerry Roth (Tenor Sax)
Bob Brescia (Keyboards, Vocals and Music Director)
Thomas "Bart" Bartleson (Drums)
Mike Edell (Keyboards and Vocals)
John Korba-Guitar/Vocals
Ralph Cohen (Douglas) (Trumpet)
Pat Soriano (Hammond B3 Organist)
Bruce Shay (Bass and Vocals)
Rusty Oppenheimer (Drums and Vocals)
Larry Ripley (Bass, Woodwinds and Vocals)
Chuck Travis (Guitar and Vocals)
Richie Gomez (Guitar and Vocals)
Michael Stoppiello (Guitar and Vocals)

1980s road band members 
 Randy Monaco  (Lead Vocals)
 Jim Bulkowski  (Lead Guitar)
 Russ Hoffmaster (Drums & Vocals)
 Rick Gainor  (Bass & Vocals)
 John Siroky (Keyboards)

Discography

Singles

Albums

References

External links
 Official website
 Group biography by Tom Simon
 

Musical groups established in 1965
Musical groups from New Jersey
Buddah Records artists
American pop music groups
Bubblegum pop groups
1965 establishments in New Jersey